The Methadones is the last album by punk rock band The Methadones. It was released on November 16, 2010 by Asian Man Records. The albums contains 5 new songs, 6 songs from The Methadones/The Copyrights Split with the remaining songs coming from out of print singles.

Track listing
 "Murmurs In The Dark" – 2:39
 "Undecided" – 2:40	
 "Arial" – 3:24	
 "April Rain" – 3:42	
 "Self Destruct" – 3:44	
 "3-2-1" – 1:20	
 "Imperfect World" – 1:25	
 "Under The Skyline" – 1:58	
 "On The Clock" – 1:58	
 "Easter Island" – 3:44	
 "What Do You Believe In?" – 2:23	
 "Showing Me The Way" – 3:02	
 "Gary Glitter" – 3:37	
 "Over The Moon" – 2:41	
 "I Believe" – 2:28	
 "Exit 17" – 2:34

Tracks 6-11 are from The Methadones/The Copyrights Split EP.
Track 12 is an outtake from the This Won't Hurt... session.
Tracks 13 and 14 are from the "Gary Glitter" single.
Tracks 15 and 16 are from the "Exit 17" single.

Personnel
Dan Vapid – guitar, vocals
Mike Byrne — guitar, vocals
Sensitive Pete – bass, vocals
Mike Soucy – drums

References

External links

The Methadones albums
2010 albums
Asian Man Records albums